Borneo FC U-20 is an Indonesian football team located in Samarinda, East Kalimantan. They are the reserve team from Borneo. They currently compete in the Elite Pro Academy U-20.

Players

Coaches 
  Fernando Gaston Soler (2015–present)

References 

Football clubs in Indonesia